The Sammarinese Christian Democratic Party (PDCS) is a Christian-democratic political party in San Marino.

The PDCS is an observer member of the European People's Party (EPP), having joined the EPP in 1993. Its Italian counterpart was the now-dissolved Christian Democracy. Its internal left-wing faction left in 2006 to form the Centre Democrats and was joined by the social democrats of Arengo and Freedom. It is led by Giovanni Lonfernini, a former Captain-Regent.

In the 2006 general election PDCS won the 32.9% of the vote and 21 out of 60 seats in the Grand and General Council. The party stood in opposition to the 2006-2008 governing political coalition of Party of Socialists and Democrats, Popular Alliance and United Left.

For the 2008 general election the party was part of the Pact for San Marino coalition and gave hospitality in its list to some candidates of the Euro-Populars for San Marino and Arengo and Freedom. The electoral coalition won 35 seats out of 60 in the Grand and General Council in the Sammarinese parliamentary election, 2008 gaining 54.22% of the national vote and a governmental majority of 5, becoming the new government of San Marino. The Sammarinese Christian Democratic Party which itself gained 22 seats (a few of which went to Euro-Populars for San Marino and Arengo and Freedom) out of the 35 the coalition and gained 31.90% of the national vote. Ernesto Benedettini became one of the two Joint Captains Regent of San Marino.

A political crisis in 2011 dissolved the old majority, and the PDCS formed a government of national unity with the Party of Socialists and Democrats, whose predecessors worked with the PDCS for decades, so restoring a political formula which led San Marino, and Italy, during the second half of the 20th century. The new alliance, San Marino Common Good, won the Sammarinese election of 2012, PDCS obtaining 21 seats together with their electoral running-mates, We Sammarinese.

References

External links
Official website

1948 establishments in San Marino
Catholic political parties
Centrist parties in Europe
Christian democratic parties in Europe
European People's Party
Political parties established in 1948
Political parties in San Marino